Bjørg Holmsen, née Gulvik (13 June 1931 – 4 January 2015) is a Norwegian politician for the Conservative Party.

She served as a deputy representative to the Parliament of Norway from Vestfold during the term 1973–1977. In total she met during 7 days of parliamentary session. She was also mayor of Brunlanes from 1976 to 1987.

References

1931 births
2015 deaths
People from Larvik
Deputy members of the Storting
Conservative Party (Norway) politicians
Mayors of places in Vestfold
Women members of the Storting
Women mayors of places in Norway